Poemenius (died c. 355) was a Roman officer who seized control of Trier in 353 in support of Constantius II and in opposition to the usurper Magnentius.

References

4th-century Roman usurpers